Tom Derache (born 29 January 1999) is a French track cyclist, who competes in sprint events.

Major results
2021
 National Track Championships
1st  Keirin
1st  Sprint
 UCI Nations Cup
1st  Keirin – St. Petersburg
3rd  Sprint – St. Petersburg
 2nd  Keirin, UEC European Championships
 UEC European Under-23 Championships
2nd  Sprint
3rd  Keirin

References

External links
 
 
 

1999 births
Living people
French male cyclists
French track cyclists
Sportspeople from Lille
Cyclists from Hauts-de-France